Leptoconops (black gnat) is a midge genus in the family Ceratopogonidae. It has a mostly tropical or subtropical distribution worldwide, but some species occur as far north as Moscow region in Russia and the Yukon Territory in Canada.

This genus is relictual, having had a pantropical distribution during the Cretaceous. The presence of Leptoconops, along with Austroconops, in ancient Lebanese amber makes these the earliest existing lineages of biting midges. Extinct species have also been described from amber from Siberia, New Jersey, Canada, Hungary, Sakhalin, France, and Spain.

Adult Leptoconops females are diurnal feeders, and suck vertebrate blood. Adults of both sexes in some species rest by burying themselves in sand. Larvae feed on algae, fungi, and bacteria. They burrow in moist, usually saline, sand or mud of desert areas and coastal and inland beaches.

Species
Leptoconops contains the following species:

Leptoconops acer Clastrier, 1973
Leptoconops albiventris de Meijere, 1915
Leptoconops algeriensis Clastrier, 1975
Leptoconops altuneshanensis Yu and Shao, 1988
Leptoconops americanus Carter, 1921
Leptoconops amplifemoralis Chanthawanich and Delfinado, 1967
†Leptoconops amplificatus Borkent, 2001
Leptoconops andersoni Clastrier and Wirth, 1978
†Leptoconops antiquus Borkent, 2001
Leptoconops arnaudi Clastrier and Wirth, 1978
Leptoconops ascius Yu and Hui, 1988
Leptoconops asilomar Clastrier and Wirth, 1978
Leptoconops atchleyi Clastrier and Wirth, 1978
Leptoconops auster Clastrier, 1981
Leptoconops aviarum Gutsevich, 1973
Leptoconops bahreinensis Clastrier and Boorman, 1987
Leptoconops bossoi Clastrier, 1981
Leptoconops belkini Wirth and Atchley, 1973
Leptoconops bequaerti (Kieffer), 1925
Leptoconops bezzii (Noè), 1905
Leptoconops bidentatus Gutsevich, 1960
Leptoconops binangulus Yu, 1989
Leptoconops binisiculus Yu and Liu, 1988
Leptoconops borealis Gutsevich, 1945
Leptoconops boreus Kalugina, 1991
Leptoconops brasiliensis (Lutz), 1913
Leptoconops brevistylus Mazumdar, Saha & Chaudhuri, 2010
Leptoconops bullsbrookensis Smee, 1966
Leptoconops bundyensis Smee, 1966
†Leptoconops burmiticus Szadziewski, 2004
Leptoconops californiensis Wirth and Atchley, 1973
Leptoconops camelorum (Kieffer), 1921
Leptoconops capensis de Meillon and Hardy, 1953
Leptoconops carteri Hoffman, 1926
Leptoconops casali Cavalieri and Chiossone, 1966
Leptoconops catawbae (Boesel), 1948
Leptoconops chenfui Yu and Xiang, 1988
Leptoconops chilensis Forattini, 1958
Leptoconops chinensis Sun, 1968
Leptoconops conulus Yu and Liu, 1990
Leptoconops copiosus Borkent, 1996
Leptoconops curvachelus Borkent, 1996
†Leptoconops daugeroni Choufani, Azar and Nel, 2011
Leptoconops demeilloni Clastrier and Nevill, 1984
Leptoconops dissimilis Clastrier, 1975
Leptoconops dixi de Meillon, 1936
Leptoconops doyeni Spinelli and Ronderos, 1993
†Leptoconops ellenbergeri Szadziewski, 2015
Leptoconops endialis Smee, 1966
Leptoconops exspectator Clastrier, 1975
Leptoconops flaviventris Kieffer, 1918
Leptoconops floridensis Wirth, 1951
Leptoconops foleyi Clastrier, 1975
Leptoconops fortipalpus Mazumdar, Saha & Chaudhuri, 2010
Leptoconops foulki Clastrier and Wirth, 1978
Leptoconops freeborni Wirth, 1952
Leptoconops fretus Yu and Zhan, 1990
Leptoconops fuscipennis Clastrier, Rioux, and Descous, 1961
Leptoconops gallicus Clastrier, 1973
Leptoconops golanensis Clastrier, 1981
Leptoconops grandis Carter, 1921
†Leptoconops gravesi Choufani et al., 2014
Leptoconops halophilus Smee, 1966
Leptoconops hamariensis Herzi and Sabatini, 1983
Leptoconops harrisoni de Meillon and Hardy, 1953
Leptoconops helobius Ma and Yu, 1990
Leptoconops hutsoni Clastrier, 1974
Leptoconops hyalinipennis Kieffer, 1918
Leptoconops indicus (Kieffer), 1918
Leptoconops interruptus (Enderlein), 1908
Leptoconops irritans (Noè), 1905
Leptoconops kerteszi Kieffer, 1908
Leptoconops kinmenensis Lien, Lin, Weng and Chin, 1996
Leptoconops knowltoni Clastrier and Wirth, 1978
Leptoconops lacteipennis Kieffer, 1918
Leptoconops laosensis Clastrier, 1974
Leptoconops latibulorum Gutsevich, 1973
Leptoconops laurae (Weiss), 1912
Leptoconops linleyi Wirth and Atchley, 1973
Leptoconops lisbonnei Harant and Galan, 1944
Leptoconops longicauda Yu, 1997
Leptoconops longicornis Carter, 1921
Leptoconops lucidus Gutsevich, 1964
Leptoconops mackerrassae Smee, 1966
Leptoconops macfiei Clastrier, 1975
Leptoconops melanderi Wirth and Atchley, 1973
Leptoconops mellori Clastrier and Boorman, 1987
Leptoconops mesopotamiensis (Patton), 1920
Leptoconops minutus Gutsevich, 1973
Leptoconops mohavensis Wirth and Atchley, 1973
Leptoconops montanus Konurbajev, 1965
Leptoconops montigenus Clastrier, 1981
Leptoconops mooloolabaensis (Smee), 1966
Leptoconops myersi (Tonnoir), 1924
†Leptoconops myanmaricus Szadziewski, 2004
Leptoconops nachitschevanicus Dzhafarov, 1961
Leptoconops nevilli Clastrier, 1981
Leptoconops nicolayi de Meillon, 1937
Leptoconops nigripes Dzhafarov, 1961
Leptoconops nipponensis Tokunaga, 1937
Leptoconops nivalis Smee, 1966
Leptoconops noei Clastrier and Coluzzi, 1973
†Leptoconops nosopheris Poinar, 2008
Leptoconops obscurus Smee, 1966
Leptoconops panamensis Ronderos and Spinelli, 1993
Leptoconops parvichelus Chanthawanich and Delfindao, 1967
Leptoconops patagoniensis Ronderos, 1990
Leptoconops pavlovskyi Dzhafarov, 1961
Leptoconops peneti (Langeron), 1913
Leptoconops petrocchiae Shannon and Del Ponte, 1927
Leptoconops primaevus Borkent, 1995 
Leptoconops pseudosetosifrons (Smee), 1966
Leptoconops pugnax Clastrier, 1973
Leptoconops reesi Clastrier and Wirth, 1978
Leptoconops rhodesiensis Carter, 1921
Leptoconops ricardoi Ronderos and Spinelli, 1992
Leptoconops riverinaensis Smee, 1966
†Leptoconops rossi Szadziewski, 2004
Leptoconops rufiventris (Kieffer), 1923
Leptoconops setosifrons (Smee), 1966
Leptoconops shangweni Xu and Yu, 1989
Leptoconops siamensis Carter, 1921
Leptoconops sibericus Szadziewski, 1996
Leptoconops smeei Wirth and Atchley, 1973
Leptoconops spinosifrons (Carter), 1921
Leptoconops stygius Skuse, 1889
Leptoconops sublettei Clastrier and Wirth, 1978
Leptoconops succineus Szadziewski, 1988
Leptoconops tarimensis Yu, 1982
Leptoconops tenebrostigmatus Mazumdar, Saha & Chaudhuri, 2010
Leptoconops tibetensis Lee, 1978
Leptoconops torrens (Townsend), 1893
Leptoconops transversalis (Kieffer), 1921
Leptoconops turkmenicus Molotova, 1967
Leptoconops umbellifer Clastrier, 1981
Leptoconops vargasi Clastrier and Wirth, 1978
Leptoconops venezuelensis Ortiz, 1952
Leptoconops vexans (Kieffer), 1921
Leptoconops wehaiensis Yu and Xue, 1988
Leptoconops werneri Wirth and Atchley, 1973
Leptoconops whitseli Clastrier and Wirth, 1978
Leptoconops woodhilli Lee, 1948
Leptoconops xuthosceles Chanthawanich and Delfinado, 1967
Leptoconops yalongensis Yu and Wang, 1988
Leptoconops yunhsienensis Yu, 1963
†Leptoconops zherikhini Szadziewski & Arillo, 2003

References

External links

 
Chironomoidea genera